Michael Shane Walsh (born 5 August 1977) is an English former footballer who spent twelve years as a professional in the Football League. A defender, he made a total of 319 appearances in league and cup competitions.

Beginning his career at Scunthorpe United in 1995, he made over 100 appearances for the club before moving to Port Vale in 1998 for a £100,000 fee. With Vale he won the Football League Trophy in 2001, but then suffered a catalogue of injuries that ended his career prematurely and severely limited his first team appearances. He retired due to injury in 2007 at the age of 29, and took up work as a gas fitter.

Career
Walsh started his professional career at Scunthorpe in 1995, making his league debut under Dave Moore as a seventeen-year-old against Scarborough in April of that year. He spent three years with the club, playing across the back four, making 124 appearances in all competitions. The Glanford Park club came close to reaching the Third Division play-offs under Brian Laws in 1997–98, but finished one point and one place behind 7th place Barnet.

He signed for John Rudge's Port Vale in June 1998 for a fee of £100,000. He played 19 First Division games in 1998–99. He featured just 14 times in 1999–2000. Walsh made 48 appearances in 2000–01, and went on to receive his only honour at the club in 2001, as he helped Vale to beat Brentford 2–1 in the Football League Trophy final at the Millennium Stadium. However his injury saga began not long after signing a new contract under Brian Horton in 2001 when Walsh underwent surgery, but by the end of the year he seemed to have recovered. However, by June 2003 another operation was needed to correct a shoulder injury. After this latest procedure he picked up an abdominal strain, though he again slowly began to recover. By November of that year he was injured again, this time because of his back, he required a series of injections and again consulted a surgeon. By February 2004 he was on the road to recovery, but the next month picked up a neck injury in a collision with Barnsley's Chris Shuker, meaning another operation.

Missing most of the 2005–06 season due to injury, new boss Martin Foyle nevertheless offered him a fresh contract in May 2006. This was on the belief that Walsh would play at least 30 games the following season. In May 2007, following a season of twenty appearances, he was informed that he would not be offered a contract for the forthcoming season. This was despite the player being desperate to reach the ten-year mark with the club to claim a testimonial, insisting "[Vale] couldn't get a Sunday league player for what I was asking." He retired from the professional game at the age of 29, and later turned out for local Northern Premier League Division One South side Alsager Town.

Style of play
Walsh was a central defender with pace, as well as excellent positional, heading and ball control skills; however he was also extremely injury prone. He was referred to by one analyst as "the lower leagues' Ledley King".

Post-retirement
After leaving the game he became a CORGI registered gas fitter at Burslem-based BGC.

Career statistics

Honours
Port Vale
Football League Trophy: 2001

References

External links

1977 births
Living people
English footballers
Association football defenders
Footballers from Rotherham
Port Vale F.C. players
Scunthorpe United F.C. players
Alsager Town F.C. players
English Football League players
Northern Premier League players